Amsonia is a genus of flowering plants in the dogbane family, Apocynaceae, first described as a genus in 1788. It is native primarily to North America with one species in East Asia and another in the eastern Mediterranean. It was named in honor of the American physician John Amson. Members of the genus are commonly known as bluestars.

Species
 Amsonia ciliata Walter – fringed bluestar – SE US, S Great Plains
 Amsonia elliptica (Thunb. ex Murray) Roem. & Schult. – Japanese bluestar – China, Japan, Korea
 Amsonia fugatei S.P.McLaughlin – San Antonio bluestar – New Mexico
 Amsonia grandiflora Alexander – Arizona bluestar – Arizona, Sonora, Durango
 Amsonia hubrichtii Woodson – Hubricht's bluestar – Arkansas, Oklahoma
 Amsonia illustris Woodson – Ozark bluestar – Mississippi Valley, also Nevada
 Amsonia jonesii Woodson – Jones' bluestar – Arizona, New Mexico, Utah, Colorado
 Amsonia kearneyana Woodson – Kearney's bluestar – Baboquivari in Pima Co. in Arizona
 Amsonia longiflora Torr. – tubular bluestar – Arizona, New Mexico, Texas, Coahuila
 Amsonia ludoviciana Vail – Louisiana bluestar – Louisiana, Mississippi, Georgia
 Amsonia orientalis Decne. – European bluestar – Greece, Turkey
 Amsonia palmeri A.Gray – Palmer's bluestar – Arizona, New Mexico, Texas, Sonora, Chihuahua
 Amsonia peeblesii Woodson – Peebles' bluestar – Arizona
 Amsonia repens Shinners – creeping bluestar – E Texas, SW Louisiana
 Amsonia rigida Shuttlw. ex Small – stiff bluestar – from Georgia to Louisiana
 Amsonia tabernaemontana Walter – eastern bluestar – S + C + E United States
 Amsonia tharpii Woodson – feltleaf bluestar – W Texas, SE New Mexico
 Amsonia tomentosa Torr. & Frém. – woolly bluestar – SW US; Chihuahua

References

 
Apocynaceae genera